Iran's population increased dramatically during the later half of the 20th century, reaching about 80 million by 2016. , Iran's population is around 86.5 million. In recent years, however, Iran's birth rate has dropped significantly. Studies project that Iran's rate of population growth will continue to slow until it stabilises above 100 million by 2050. Half of Iran's population was under 35 years old in 2012.

In 2009, the number of households stood at 15.3 million (4.8 persons per household). Families earn some 11.8 million rials (about $960) per month on average (2012).

According to the OECD/World Bank statistics population growth in Iran from 1990 to 2008 was 17.6 million and 32%. The literacy rate was 80% in 2002, and 85% in 2016. The fertility rate has fallen to 1.6, below the natural replacement rate of 2.1.

Population
According to the 2016 population census the population of Iran was 79.9 million, a fourfold increase since 1956. Between 1976 and 1986, an average annual population growth of almost 4% was reached, but due to decreasing fertility levels the growth decreased to 1.2% between 2011 and 2016.

Vital statistics

UN estimates
(2022 estimates).

1per 1000; 2 TFR =  number of children per woman; 3per 1000 births

Registered births and deaths
(2001 statistics)

Current vital statistics

Population Estimates by Sex and Age Group (01.VII.2020):

Table 9 – Population and Average Annual Growth by Provinces: 2006 and 2011

1 The population of the provinces of Alborz and Tehran for 2006 and their average annual growth have been calculated based on the data of 2011.

Unofficial Translation 17

Table 10 – Population Percentages by Province: 2006 and 2011 (Percentage)

1 The population of the provinces of Alborz and Tehran for 2006 and their average annual growth have been calculated based on the data of 2011.

Languages and ethnic groups

The largest linguistic group comprises speakers of Iranian languages, like modern Persian, Kurdish, Gilaki, Mazandarani, Luri, Talysh, and Balochi. Speakers of Turkic languages, most notably Azerbaijanis, which is by far the second-most spoken language in the country, but also the Turkmen, and the Qashqai peoples, comprise a substantial minority. The remainder are primarily speakers of Semitic languages such as Arabic and Assyrian. A small number of Mandaeans in Khuzestan speak Mandaic. There are small groups using other Indo-European languages such as Armenian and Russian; also, Georgian (a member of the Kartvelian language family) is spoken in a large pocket only by those Iranian Georgians that live in Fereydan, Fereydunshahr. Most of those Georgians who live in the north Iranian provinces of Gilan, Mazandaran, Isfahan, Tehran Province and the rest of Iran no longer speak the language.
The Circassians in Iran, a very large minority in the past and speakers of the Circassian language, have been strongly assimilated and absorbed within the population in the past few centuries. However, significant pockets do exist spread over the country, and they are the second-largest Caucasus-derived group in the nation after the Georgians.

Jews have had a continuous presence in Iran since the time of Cyrus the Great of the Achaemenid Empire. In 1948, there were approximately 140,000–150,000 Jews living in Iran. According to the Tehran Jewish Committee, the Jewish population of Iran was (more recently) estimated at 25,000 to 35,000, of which approximately 15,000 are in Tehran with the rest residing in Hamadan, Shiraz, Isfahan, Kermanshah, Yazd, Kerman, Rafsanjan, Borujerd, Sanandaj, Tabriz and Urmia. However, the official 2011 state census recorded only 8,756 Jews in Iran.

The CIA World Factbook (which is based on 2013 statistics) gives the following numbers for the languages spoken in Iran today: Persian, Luri, Gilaki and Mazandarani 66%; Azerbaijani and other Turkic languages 18%; Kurdish 10%; Arabic 2%; Balochi 2%; others 2% (Armenian, Georgian, Circassian, Assyrian, etc.).

Other sources, such as the Library of Congress, and the Encyclopedia of Islam (Leiden) give Iran's ethnic groups as following: Persians 65%, Azerbaijanis 16%, Kurds 7%, Lurs 6%, Arabs 2%, Baloch 2%, Turkmens 1%, Turkic tribal groups (e.g. Qashqai) 1%, and non-Persian, non-Turkic groups (e.g. Armenians, Georgians, Assyrians, Circassians) less than 1%. For sources prior to and after 2000, see Languages and ethnicities in Iran.

Urban population 

In addition to its international migration pattern, Iran also exhibits one of the steepest urban growth rates in the world according to the UN humanitarian information unit. According to 2015 population estimates, approximately 73.4 per cent of Iran's population lives in urban areas, up from 27 per cent in 1950.

The following is a list of the eight most populous cities in the country:

Religious affiliations

About 99% of the Iranians are Muslims; 90% belong to the Shi'a branch of Islam, the official state religion, and about 9% belong to the Sunni branch, which predominates in neighbouring Muslim countries. Less than 1% non-Muslim minorities include Christians, Zoroastrians, Jews, Baháʼís, Mandaeans, and Yarsan. By far the largest group of Christians in Iran are Armenians under the Armenian Apostolic Church which has between 110,000, 250,000, and 300,000, adherents. There are hundreds of Christian churches in Iran. The Baháʼí Faith, Iran's largest non-Muslim religious minority with a population around 300,000, is not officially recognised (and therefore not included in the census results), and has been persecuted since in inception in Iran. Since the 1979 revolution the persecution of Baháʼís has increased with executions, the denial of civil rights and liberties, and the denial of access to higher education and employment. Unofficial estimates for the Assyrian Christian population range between 20,000, and 70,000. The number of Iranian Mandaeans is a matter of dispute. In 2009, there were an estimated 5,000 to 10,000 Mandaeans in Iran, according to the Associated Press. Whereas Alarabiya has put the number of Iranian Mandaeans as high as 60,000 in 2011.

Iranian citizens abroad

The term "Iranian citizens abroad" or " Iranian/Persian diaspora" refers to the Iranian people and their children born in Iran but living outside of Iran. Migrant Iranian workers abroad remitted less than two billion dollars home in 2006.

As of 2010, there are about four to five million Iranians living abroad, mostly in the United States, Canada, Europe, Persian Gulf States, Turkey, Australia and the broader Middle East. According to the 2000 Census and other independent surveys, there are an estimated 1 million Iranian-Americans living in the U.S., in particular, the Los Angeles area is estimated to be host to approximately 72,000 Iranians, earning the Westwood area of LA the nickname Tehrangeles. Other metropolises that have large Iranian populations include Dubai with 300,000 Iranians, Vancouver, London, Toronto, San Francisco Bay Area, Washington D.C., Buenos Aires, Mexico City, Stockholm, Berlin, Hamburg and Frankfurt. Their combined net worth is estimated to be $1.3 trillion.

Note that this differs from the other Iranian peoples living in other areas of Greater Iran, who are of related ethnolinguistical family, speaking languages belonging to the Iranian languages which is a branch of Indo-European languages.

Refugee population

Iran hosts one of the largest refugee population in the world, with more than one million refugees, mostly from Afghanistan (80%) and Iraq (10%). Since 2006, Iranian officials have been working with the UNHCR and Afghan officials for their repatriation. Between 1979 and 1997, UNHCR spent more than US$1 billion on Afghan refugees in Pakistan but only $150 million on those in Iran. In 1999, the Iranian government estimated the cost of maintaining its refugee population at US$10 million per day, compared with the US$18 million UNHCR allocated for all of its operations in Iran in 1999. As of 2016, some 300,000 work permits have been issued for foreign nationals in Iran.

CIA World Factbook demographic statistics 

The following demographic statistics are from the CIA World Factbook, unless otherwise indicated.

Age structure
 0–14 years: 24.11% (male 10,472,844/female 10,000,028)
 15–24 years: 13.36% (male 5,806,034/female 5,537,561)
 25–54 years: 48.94% (male 21,235,038/female 20,327,384)
 55–64 years: 7.72% (male 3,220,074/female 3,337,420)
 65 years and over: 5.87% (male 2,316,677/female 2,670,254) (2020 est.)

Median age
 total: 31.7 years
 male: 31.5 years
 female: 32 years (2020 est.)

Population growth rate
 1.03% (2021 est.)

Birth rate
 15.78 births/1,000 population (2021 est.)

Death rate
 5.14 deaths/1,000 population (2021 est.)

Urbanization
 urban population: 76.3% of total population (2021)
 rate of urbanisation: 1.32% annual rate of change (2020-25 est.)

Sex ratio
 at birth: 1.05 male(s)/female
 0-14 years: 1.05 male(s)/female
 15-24 years: 1.05 male(s)/female
 25-54 years: 1.04 male(s)/female
 55-64 years: 0.96 male(s)/female
 65 years and over: 0.87 male(s)/female
 total population: 1.03 male(s)/female (2020 est.)

Life expectancy at birth
 total population: 75.06 years
 male: 73.71 years
 female: 76.48 years (2021 est.)

Total fertility rate
 1.93 children born/woman (2021 est.)

Literacy
 definition: age 15 and over can read and write
 total population: 85.5%
 male: 90.4%
 female: 80.8% (2016)

Genetics

Y-chromosome DNA 
Y-Chromosome DNA Y-DNA represents the male lineage, the Iranian Y-chromosome pool is as follows where haplogroups, R1 (25%), J2 (23%) G (14%), J1 (8%) E1b1b (5%), L (4%), 
Q (4%), comprise more than 85% of the total chromosomes.

Mitochondrial DNA 
Mitochondrial DNA (mtDNA) represents the female lineage. West Eurasian mtDNA makes up over 90% of the Iranian population on average. (2013).

Among them, U3b3 lineages appear to be restricted to populations of Iran and the Caucasus, while the sub-cluster U3b1a is common in the whole Near East region.

In Iran outliers in the Y-chromosomes and Mitochondrial DNA gene pool are consisted of the north Iranian ethnicities, such as the Gilaks and Mazandarani's, whose genetic build up including chromosomal DNA are nearly identical to the major South Caucasian ethnicities, namely the Georgians, Armenians and Azerbaijani's. Other outliers are made by the Baloch people, representing a mere 1–2% of the total Iranian population, who have more patrilinial and mitochondrial DNA lines leaning towards northwest South Asian ethnic groups.

Levels of genetic variation in Iranian populations are comparable to the other groups from the Caucasus, Anatolia and Europe.

People of Iranian ancestry

Tats (Caucasus)

The "Tats" are an Iranian people, presently living within Azerbaijan and Russia (mainly Southern Dagestan). The Tats are part of the indigenous peoples of Iranian origin in the Caucasus.

Tats use the Tat language, a southwestern Iranian language and a variety of Persian  Azerbaijani and Russian are also spoken. Tats are mainly Shia Muslims, with a significant Sunni Muslim minority. Likely the ancestors of modern Tats settled in South Caucasus when the Sassanid Empire from the 3rd to 7th centuries built cities and founded military garrisons to strengthen their positions in this region.

Parsis

The Parsis are the close-knit Zoroastrian community based primarily in India but also found in Pakistan. Parsis are descended from Persian Zoroastrians who emigrated to the Indian subcontinent over 1,000 years ago. Indian census data (2001) records 69,601 Parsis in India, with a concentration in and around the city of Mumbai (previously known as Bombay). There are approximately 8,000 Parsis elsewhere on the subcontinent, with an estimated 2,500 Parsis in the city of Karachi and approximately 50 Parsi families in Sri Lanka. The number of Parsis worldwide is estimated to be fewer than 100,000 (Eliade, 1991:254).

Iranis

In Pakistan and India, the term "Irani" has come to denote Iranian Zoroastrians who have migrated to Pakistan and India within the last two centuries, as opposed to most Parsis who arrived in India over 1000 years ago. Many of them moved during the Qajar era, when persecution of Iranian Zoroastrians was rampant. They are culturally and linguistically closer to the Zoroastrians of Iran. Unlike the Parsis, they speak a Dari dialect, the language spoken by the Iranian Zoroastrians in Yazd and Kerman. Their last names often resemble modern Iranian names, however Irani is a common surname among them. In India they are mostly located in modern-day Mumbai while in Pakistan they are mostly located in modern-day Karachi. In both Pakistan and India, they are famous for their restaurants and tea-houses. Some, such as Ardeshir Irani, have also become very famous in cinema.

Ajam (Bahrain)

The "Ajam" are an ethnic community of Bahrain, of Iranian origin. They have traditionally been merchants living in specific quarters of Manama and Muharraq. The Iranians who adhere to Shiite sect of Islam are Ajam, and they are different from the Huwala. Ajams are also a large percentage of the populace in UAE, Kuwait, Qatar and Oman.

In addition to this, many names of ancient villages in Bahrain are of Persian origin. It is believed that these names were given during the Safavid rule of Bahrain (1501–1722). i.e. Karbabad, Salmabad, Karzakan, Duraz, Barbar, which indicates that the history of Ajams is much older.

Huwala

Huwala are the descendants of Persians and Arab-Persians who belong to the Sunni sect of Islam. Huwala migrated from Ahvaz in Iran to the Persian Gulf in the seventeenth and eighteenth century.

Recent immigration

Most of the large Circassian migrational waves towards mainland Iran stem from the Safavid and Qajar era, however a certain amount also stem from the relatively recent arrivals that migrated as the Circassians were displaced from the Caucasus in the 19th century. A Black African population exists due to historical slavery.
A substantial number of Russians arrived in the early 20th century as refugees from the Russian Revolution, but their number has dwindled following the Iran crisis of 1946 and the Iranian Revolution.
In the 20th to 21st centuries, there has been limited immigration to Iran from Turkey, Iraqis (especially huge numbers during the 1970s known as Moaveds), Afghanistan (mostly arriving as refugees in 1978), Lebanese (especially in Qom, though a Lebanese community has been present in the nation for centuries),
Indians (mostly arriving temporarily during the 1950s to 1970s, typically working as doctors, engineers, and teachers), Koreans (mostly in the 1970s as labour migrants), China (mostly since the 2000s working in engineering or business projects), and Pakistan, partly due to labour migrants and partly to Balochi ties across the Iranian-Pakistani border.
About 200,000 Iraqis arrived as refugees in 2003, mostly living in refugee camps near the border; an unknown number of these has since returned to Iraq.

Over the same period, there has also been substantial emigration from Iran, especially since the Iranian revolution (see Iranian diaspora, Human capital flight from Iran, Jewish exodus from Iran), especially
to the United States, Canada, Germany, Israel, and Sweden.

See also

Culture of Iran
Economy of Iran
Education in Iran
Ethnic groups in West Asia
Health care in Iran
Family planning in Iran
Human rights in Iran
Human capital flight from Iran
Iranian names
Social class in Iran
Women in Iran
List of Iranians

References

External links

Statistical Center of Iran
BBC – Iran in Maps – Map of Iranian ethnic groups & population density
Iran: A Vast Diaspora Abroad and Millions of Refugees at Home – Migration Information Institute (2006)
Human Development Report – 2009 (UNDP Iran's entry)